Don River Bridge may refer to:

 Don River Bridge, Bowen, Queensland, Australia; across the Don River
 Don River Bridge, Rannes, Queensland, Australia; across the Don River
 Don River Bridge, Toronto, Ontario, Canada; a rail bridge over the Don River; see List of bridges in Toronto

See also 

 
 Don Bridge (disambiguation)
 Bridge of Don (disambiguation)
 Don River (disambiguation)
 Don (disambiguation)